Filippi is an Italian surname. Notable people with the surname include:

Alana Filippi (1960 or 1961 – 2020), French singer and songwriter
Alessia Filippi (born 1987), Italian swimmer
Amnon Filippi (born 1969), American poker player
Ange-Marie Filippi-Codaccioni (1925–2018), French historian and Communist politician
Bruno Filippi (1900–1919),  Italian anarchist and writer
Camilla Filippi (born 1979), Italian actress
Camillo Filippi (died 1574), Italian painter
Ernesto Filippi (born 1950),  Uruguayan football referee
Gloria Filippi (born 1992),  Italian archer
Joe Filippi (born 1953), Scottish footballer
John Filippi (born 1995),  French racing driver
Luca Filippi (born 1985), Italian racing driver
Mattia Filippi (born 1993), Italian footballer
Roberto Filippi (born 1948), Italian footballer 
Rodéric Filippi (born 1989), French footballer
Sebastiano Filippi (c.1536–1602), Italian painter
Tomáš Filippi (born 1992), Czech ice hockey player

See also
Filippi Boats, Italian rowing equipment manufacturer
Philippi (disambiguation)

Italian-language surnames
Patronymic surnames
Surnames from given names